Montreal Impact 1–6 Toronto FC, often referred to as the Miracle in Montreal, was a soccer match played on June 18, 2009 at Saputo Stadium in Montreal, Quebec between Montreal Impact of the USL First Division and Toronto FC of Major League Soccer.

Background
The match was the final fixture of the 2009 Canadian Championship. With Montreal already eliminated and the Vancouver Whitecaps leading the table, Toronto FC needed to win by 4 or more goals to capture its first Voyageurs Cup and a berth in the 2009–10 CONCACAF Champions League.

Match
Tony Donatelli gave Montreal a 1–0 lead early in the first half on a penalty kick which meant Toronto needed 5 or more goals to beat Vancouver on goal differential. Toronto went on to score 6 unanswered goals, including 3 straight from captain Dwayne De Rosario on route to capturing the 2009 Canadian Championship and a place in the CONCACAF Champions League. The 6–1 defeat was the worst in Montreal's franchise history at the time.

Details

Aftermath

Toronto FC would go on to lose to Puerto Rico Islanders in the preliminary round of 2009–10 CONCACAF Champions League.

The match was a significant moment in shaping the rivalry between Montreal Impact and Toronto FC. In 2011, Montreal Impact officially joined Major League Soccer becoming the third Canadian team to do so after Toronto FC and Vancouver Whitecaps FC. This only furthered the rivalry which became known as the 401 derby and later the Canadian Classique.

Montreal would get retribution against Toronto, beating them 6–0 in the same venue during the 2013 Canadian Championship. This remains the largest margin of victory in Canadian Classique history.

See also
Canadian Classique
Canadiens–Maple Leafs rivalry

References

Notes

External links
Match highlights

Toronto FC matches
CF Montréal matches
Canadian soccer club matches